Jordy Joan Candia Zeballos (born 20 April 1996) is a Bolivian professional footballer who plays as a right back for Blooming.

References

External links

1996 births
Living people
Bolivian footballers
Bolivia international footballers
Association football fullbacks
Bolivian Primera División players
Sport Boys Warnes players
Bolivia youth international footballers
Sportspeople from Santa Cruz de la Sierra